As a nation of islands and narrow, steep valleys, dams play a vital role in Japanese society as they are constructed primarily to control floods, supply water and generate hydroelectric power.

The dams are arranged by prefecture in the list below.

Chubu region
 Aichi
 Fukui
 Gifu
 Ishikawa
 Nagano
 Niigata
 Shizuoka
 Toyama
 Yamanashi

Chugoku region
 Hiroshima
 Okayama
 Shimane
 Tottori
 Yamaguchi

Kansai region
 Hyogo
 Kyoto
 Mie
 Nara
 Osaka
 Shiga
 Wakayama

Kanto region
 Chiba
 Gunma
 Ibaraki
 Kanagawa
 Saitama
 Tochigi
 Tokyo

Kyushu region
 Fukuoka
 Kagoshima
 Kumamoto
 Miyazaki
 Nagasaki
 Okinawa
 Oita
 Saga

Hokkaido region
 Hokkaido

Shikoku region
 Ehime
 Kagawa
 Kochi
 Tokushima

Tohoku region
 Akita
 Aomori
 Fukushima
 Iwate
 Miyagi
 Yamagata

See also
List of power stations in Japan
List of dams and reservoirs

References

 
Japan
Dams